Gavin Turnbull Simonds, 1st Viscount Simonds,  (28 November 1881 – 28 June 1971) was a British judge, politician and Lord High Chancellor of Great Britain.

Background and education
Simonds was born in Reading, Berkshire, the son of Louis DeLuze Simonds and his wife, Mary Elizabeth Turnbull. They were members of a well-known Berkshire family of brewing magnates (see H & G Simonds Ltd). He was educated at Winchester College (where he was later a Fellow, and Warden from 1946 to 1951) and at New College, Oxford.

Legal and political career
Simonds was called to the bar in 1906, and appointed a King's Counsel in 1924. He was elected a Bencher of Lincoln's Inn in 1929 and was Treasurer from 1951. He served as a Judge of the Chancery Division of the High Court of Justice between 1937, when he was knighted, and 1944. In the latter year he was appointed a Lord of Appeal in Ordinary, sworn of the Privy Council and created a life peer as Baron Simonds, of Sparsholt in the County of Southampton.

Simonds remained a Law Lord until 1951, when Winston Churchill appointed him Lord Chancellor. He was holder of the office at the time of the Coronation of Queen Elizabeth II, adding a major ceremonial role to his judicial one.

In June 1952 he was made a hereditary peer as Baron Simonds, of Sparsholt in the County of Southampton. He held this post until 1954, when he was created Viscount Simonds, of Sparsholt in the County of Southampton. He again served as a Lord of Appeal in Ordinary from 1954 to 1962. He was also High Steward of Oxford University from 1954 to 1967, and High Steward of the City of Winchester from 1951.

The Shaw v DPP case
In 1962 Simonds achieved some notoriety in the case of Shaw v DPP, where the House of Lords created the new criminal offence of "conspiracy to corrupt public morals". He declared:"In the sphere of criminal law I entertain no doubt that there remains in the Courts of Law a residual power to enforce the supreme and fundamental purpose of the law, to conserve not only the safety and order but also the moral welfare of the State, and that it is their duty to guard it against attacks which may be the more insidious because they are novel and unprepared for".

Lord Reid was the only dissenting judge, saying: "Parliament is the proper place, and I am firmly of opinion the only proper place, (to pass new laws). Where Parliament fears to tread it is not for the courts to rush in".

Family
Lord Simonds had three sons who all predeceased him. Robert Francis Simonds died in infancy; John Mellor Simonds (1915–1944) was killed in action at Arnhem in 1944, and Gavin Alexander Simonds (1915–1951) died as a result of illness contracted on active service in East Africa in 1951. Consequently, the hereditary barony and viscountcy became extinct on his death in June 1971, aged 89.

Arms

References

1881 births
1971 deaths
Alumni of New College, Oxford
Chancery Division judges
Contributors to Halsbury's Laws of England
English barristers
Knights Bachelor
Law lords
Lord chancellors of Great Britain
Members of the Judicial Committee of the Privy Council
Members of the Privy Council of the United Kingdom
Ministers in the third Churchill government, 1951–1955
People educated at Summer Fields School
People educated at Winchester College
People from Reading, Berkshire
20th-century King's Counsel
20th-century English lawyers
Life peers created by George VI
Hereditary barons created by Elizabeth II
Viscounts created by Elizabeth II